The house at 3 Crown Street in Nelsonville, New York, United States is located at the corner of Crown, a short side street, and Secor Street. It is a 19th-century brick home that was added to the National Register of Historic Places in 1982 as "the finest mid-century Italianate structure in the area."

It is a two-story, five-bay brick house on a stone foundation. The centrally-located doorway, behind a shed-roofed porch with two decorative piers, has an arched transom and four-paneled sidelights. All the windows have segmented arched brick lintels and shutters. The gabled roofline is distinguished by a modillioned cornice, and is pierced by two brick chimneys on the south and one large one at a cross-gable on the north. A rear wing has been added since the house was built.

Local property tax records suggest the house was built in 1868. It does not appear on the first map of Nelsonville, in 1867, but is on an 1876 version. There, its owner is identified as J. and B. Secor. Local builder E. Ferris, with whom Secor co-owned another property in town, is noted as being active in that area of the village on the earlier map. He is thus considered likely to have built 3 Crown Street.

Since the Secors, it has been through a number of owners, mainly physicians. They have collectively made very little change to the house.

See also

National Register of Historic Places listings in Putnam County, New York

References

Houses on the National Register of Historic Places in New York (state)
Houses completed in 1868
Italianate architecture in New York (state)
Houses in Putnam County, New York
National Register of Historic Places in Putnam County, New York